Benjamin Watts J. Jones (born 1885, year of death unknown) was a Welsh football manager and chairman.

Jones originated from Swansea. He served as a director and chairman of Swansea Town, helping them gain admission to The Football League in 1921, as well as serving on the selection committee of the Football Association of Wales when he was appointed manager of Cardiff City in February 1934, taking charge as the club was in its lowest position since entering the Football League in 1920 after finishing bottom of Division Three South.

At the start of the 1934–35 season, Jones released all but five of the clubs professional players and brought in 17 new players in their place but had little cash to spend and struggled to turn the side around. In 1936 he appointed former Wales international Bill Jennings as a coach and would eventually step down as manager in order for Jennings to take over in 1937. He instead took a place on the board which he held until the outbreak of World War II.

Managerial statistics

References

External links

1885 births
Year of death missing
Cardiff City F.C. directors and chairmen
Cardiff City F.C. managers
Welsh football managers